The 2012 PDC Pro Tour was a series of non-televised darts tournaments organised by the Professional Darts Corporation (PDC). They were the Professional Dart Players Association (PDPA) Players Championships, the UK Open Qualifiers, and the new European Tour events.  This year there were 33 PDC Pro Tour events – 20 Players Championships, 8 UK Open Qualifiers, and 5 European Tour events.

Prize money
Prize money for each Players Championship and UK Open Qualifier is £34,600, unchanged from 2011. Prize money for each European Tour event was £82,100.

In addition, the 32 players who failed to qualify for a European Tour event at the final qualifying stage receive £100. A further £400 per Pro Tour event (£800 per European Tour event) was reserved for a nine-dart finish. If this was not won in an event, it was carried over to the next event, and so on until a nine-dart finish was achieved. Once the prize fund was won, it reverted to the starting value for the next event.

PDC Pro Tour Card
128 players were granted Tour Cards, which enabled them to participate in all Players Championships, UK Open Qualifiers and European Tour events.

Tour cards 
The 2012 Tour Cards were awarded to:
64 players from the PDC Order of Merit after the 2012 World Championship
20 Tour Card holders from the previous year's Qualifying School not included among the 64 Order of Merit qualifiers
no Tour Card holders from the previous year's 2010 PDC Women's World Championship invitations ( Tricia Wright and  Stacy Bromberg both resigned their membership)
1 semi-finalist from the 2012 BDO World Championship ( Ted Hankey; the other three semi-finalists  Christian Kist,  Wesley Harms and  Tony O'Shea declined invitations)
1 finalist from the 2012 PDC World Youth Championship ( James Hubbard; the other finalist  Michael van Gerwen was among the 64 qualified players from the Order of Merit)
2 highest-ranking players from the 2011 PDC Youth Tour Order of Merit not already qualified ( Paul Barham and  Reece Robinson)
40 qualifiers from a four-day Qualifying School in Barnsley (4 semi-finalists from each day, plus the top 24 players from the Q School Order of Merit)

Q School
The PDC Pro Tour Qualifying School took place at the Metrodome in Barnsley from January 19–22.

A Q School Order of Merit was also created by using the following points system:

To complete the field of 128 Tour Card Holders, places were allocated down the final Qualifying School Order of Merit. The following players picked up Tour Cards as a result:

Players Championships
(All matches – best of 11 legs)

Spanish Darts Trophy Players Championship 1 at the Hotel Melia Benidorm, Alicante on 28 January.

Spanish Darts Trophy Players Championship 2 at the Hotel Melia Benidorm, Alicante on 29 January.

Players Championship 3 at the Rivermead Centre, Reading on 10 March.

Players Championship 4 at the Rivermead Centre, Reading on 11 March.

Players Championship 5 at the K2 Centre, Crawley on 26 May.

Players Championship 6 at the K2 Centre, Crawley on 27 May.

Players Championship 7 at the NIA Community Hall, Birmingham on 16 June.

Players Championship 8 at the NIA Community Hall, Birmingham on 17 June.

Players Championship 9 at the K2 Centre, Crawley on 30 June.

Players Championship 10 at the K2 Centre, Crawley on 1 July.

Players Championship 11 at the Barnsley Metrodome, Barnsley on 15 September.

Players Championship 12 at the Barnsley Metrodome, Barnsley on 16 September.

Players Championship 13 at the Citywest Hotel, Dublin on 6 October.

Players Championship 14 at the Citywest Hotel, Dublin on 7 October.

Players Championship 15 at the Gleneagle Hotel, Killarney, Ireland on 20 October.

Players Championship 16 at the Gleneagle Hotel, Killarney, Ireland on 21 October.

Players Championship 17 at the K2 Centre, Crawley on 3 November.

Players Championship 18 at the K2 Centre, Crawley on 4 November.

Players Championship 19 at the Barnsley Metrodome, Barnsley on 24 November.

Players Championship 20 at the Barnsley Metrodome, Barnsley on 25 November.

Youth Tour
The PDC Youth Tour consisted of 18 events held across seven weekends, where two events were played on the Saturday and one event on the Sunday with the exception of the final weekend. Events were open to players aged between 14 and 21 at the beginning of the year. The top 32 players from the Youth Tour Order of Merit qualified for the 2013 PDC World Youth Championship.

UK Open Qualifiers

European Tour

Scandinavian Darts Corporation Pro Tour

North American Pro Tour

Australian Grand Prix Pro Tour

The Australian Grand Prix rankings are calculated from events across Australia. The top player in the rankings automatically qualifies for the 2013 World Championship.

Other PDC tournaments
The PDC also held a number of other tournaments during 2012. These were mainly smaller events with low prize money, and some had eligibility restrictions. All of these tournaments were non-ranking.

References

External links
2012 PDC Calendar

 
PDC Pro Tour
PDC Pro Tour